Tal Berman (Hebrew: טל ברמן, born December 11, 1973) is an Israeli TV host and Radio broadcaster.

Biography 
Berman was born in 1973 in Tel Aviv. Berman served in the Israel Defense Forces as a radio broadcaster on the Israel Defense Forces Radio in which he exclusively hosted a number of radio shows throughout his military service.

After his military service Berman hosted the television game show "Hugo" in the Israeli Children's Channel, and afterwards he also hosted the late-night talk show "Parpar Layila" on Channel 2 together with the Israeli Stand-up comedian Ran Telem.

He hosted the sport show "Stanga" on Channel 2, and hosted the soccer radio show "Non-stop goals" (שערים ללא הפסקה) alongside the Israeli football manager Shlomo Scharf.

In 2004 Berman started hosting the entertainment show "Ha-Retzu'a" on the cable comedy channel Beep during the show's first two seasons. In addition he also hosted the science show "Science news" (חדשות המדע) on the Israeli Channel 8.

In 2006 Berman hosted the late-night current affairs show "After all" (אחרי הכל) on the Israeli Channel 2.

In 2007 Berman hosted the show "Talent or failure" (כישרון או כישלון) on Channel 2 alongside the Israeli comedian Shalom Assayag.

Since 2002 Berman hosts a daily morning show together with Aviad Kisos. The show aired on the local radio station "Radio Tel Aviv" for seven and a half years, and is currently broadcast on the local radio station "Radio 99".

In 2009 Berman began hosting the cultural show "Bad culture" (תרבות רעה) on the Israeli satellite channel Yes Stars.

Personal life 
In February 2004 Berman married Amy Friedman, a clinical psychologist. The couple has four children.

References

External links
 

1973 births
Israeli Jews
Living people
People from Tel Aviv
Israeli television presenters
Israeli radio presenters